Copilia is a genus of copepods in the family Sapphirinidae. The eyes in members of this genus have two lenses, arranged like those in a telescope.

Species 
The genus Copilia contains the following species:

 Copilia asiaticus (F. Dahl, 1894)
 Copilia atlantica Lubbock, 1856
 Copilia brucii Thompson, 1888
 Copilia denticulata Claus, 1863
 Copilia elliptica Giesbrecht, 1891
 Copilia fultoni T. Scott, 1894
 Copilia hendorffi F. Dahl, 1894
 Copilia lata Giesbrecht, 1891
 Copilia longistylis Mori, 1933
 Copilia mediterranea (Claus, 1863)
 Copilia mirabilis Dana, 1852
 Copilia nicaeensis Leuckart, 1859
 Copilia oblonga Giesbrecht, 1891
 Copilia pellucida (Haeckel, 1864)
 Copilia quadrata Dana, 1849
 Copilia recta Giesbrecht, 1891
 Copilia vitrea (Haeckel, 1864)

References

External links 
 

Poecilostomatoida